Scinax x-signatus (common name: Venezuela snouted treefrog or Venezuelan snouted treefrog) is a species of frog in the family Hylidae. It is found in Brazil, the Guyanas (Guyana, French Guiana, Suriname), Venezuela and Colombia. Introduced populations exist on Guadeloupe and two nearby smaller islands, Marie Galante and La Désirade, and on Martinique. It may represent more than one species.

Scinax x-signatus is a very common frog inhabiting tropical savannas, forest edges, and open areas, and is very adaptable to habitat modification. It is considered an invasive species on Guadeloupe, threatening native frogs through competition.

Breeding takes place in standing water, both permanent and seasonal. Males call from the vegetation above and around ponds.

References

External links

Scinax x-signatus at the Encyclopedia of Life

x-signatus
Amphibians of Brazil
Amphibians of Colombia
Amphibians of French Guiana
Amphibians of Guyana
Amphibians of Suriname
Amphibians of Venezuela
Amphibians described in 1824
Taxonomy articles created by Polbot